Denise Masson (5 August 1901 – 10 November 1994), nicknamed "the Lady of Marrakech", was a 20th-century French islamologist who translated the Quran from Arabic into French, published in 1967. According to her colleague André Chouraqui, she may have been inspired by the Latin translation of Louis Maracci (1698), repeated by Christian Reineccius.

Publications 
1958: .
1967: Le Coran, Gallimard
1980:  Bibliothèque de la Pléiade.
1986: 
1986: 
1988: 
1989:  Autobiography.

References

External links 
 Biographie de Denise Masson on Institut français de Marrakech
  Le Coran, traduction de Denise Masson [compte rendu] on Persée 
 Denise Masson, la dame de Marrakech video on KTO

1901 births
Writers from Paris
1994 deaths
French scholars of Islam
Translators of the Quran into French
20th-century translators